Convict 993 is a lost 1918 silent film directed by William Parke and starring Irene Castle. It was distributed by the Pathé Exchange Company.

Cast
Irene Castle - Roslyn Ayre
Warner Oland - Dan Mallory
Helene Chadwick - Neva Stokes
Harry Benham - Rodney Travers
J. H. Gilmour - Bob Ainslee
Paul Everton - Jim Morton
Bert Starkey - Bill Avery
Ethyle Cooke - Stella Preston

References

External links
 Convict 993 at IMDb.com

 lantern slide

1918 films
Lost American films
Pathé Exchange films
American black-and-white films
American silent feature films
Silent American drama films
1918 drama films
1918 lost films
Lost drama films
1910s American films